The current structure of the Royal Netherlands Army is as follows:

Structure

Order of Battle graphic

Land Forces Headquarters 
The Land Forces Headquarters (Dutch: Hoofdkwartier landmacht) is based at the Kromhoutkazerne in Utrecht and consists of the following departments:

  Land Forces Headquarters, in Utrecht
 Land Forces Command Staff (Staf Commando Landstrijdkrachten)
 Training & Operations Directorate (Directie Training & Operatiën)
 Personnel & Organisation Directorate (Directie Personeel & Organisatie)
 Materiel & Services Directorate (Directie Materieel & Diensten)
 Army Council (Landmachtraad)
 Land Forces Commander Cabinet (Kabinet)
 Staff Group (Stafgroep)
 Finance & Controlling Department (Afdeling Financiën en Control)

11 Air Assault Brigade 
The 11 Air Assault Brigade (Dutch: 11 Luchtmobiele Brigade) is a rapidly deployable air manoeuvre infantry brigade integrated into the Rapid Forces Division (German: Division Schnelle Kräfte) of the German Army since 2014. The brigade is based In the northern (Assen) and central part (Arnhem area) of the Netherlands and consists of the following units:

  11 Air Assault Brigade, HQ in Schaarsbergen
 11 Staff/ headquarter Company (11 Stafcompagnie), in Schaarsbergen and Deelen Air Base
 11 (AASLT/PARA) Infantry Battalion "Garde Grenadiers en Jagers" (11 Infanteriebataljon Garde Grenadiers en Jagers), in Schaarsbergen
 A; B; C and D Company
 12 (AASLT/SOF Support) Infantry Battalion "Regiment van Heutsz" (12 Infanteriebataljon Regiment Van Heutsz), in Schaarsbergen
 A; B; C and D Company
 13 (AASLT) Infantry Battalion "Stoottroepen Prins Bernhard" (13 Infanteriebataljon Stoottroepen Prins Bernhard), in Assen
 A; B; C (PARA) and D Company
 20 National Reserve Corps (NATRES) Battalion (20 Natresbataljon), in The Hague
 Alpha Company (Alfacompagnie), in The Hague
 Bravo Company (Bravocompagnie), in Bergen
 Charlie Company (Charliecompagnie), in Amsterdam
 Delta Company (Deltacompagnie), in The Hague
 Echo Company (Echocompagnie), in Stroe
 Foxtrot Company (Foxtrotcompagnie), in Schaarsbergen
 11 (AASLT) Brigade Reconnaissance Squadron "Huzaren van Boreel" (11 Brigade Verkennings Eskadron Huzaren van Boreel), in Schaarsbergen
Pathfinder Platoon (Pathfinderpeloton), in Schaarsbergen
 11 (AASLT) Engineer Company (11 Geniecompagnie), in Schaarsbergen
 11 (AASLT) Supply Company (11 Bevoorradingscompagnie), in Schaarsbergen
 11 (AASLT) Medical Company (11 Geneeskundige compagnie), in Assen and Schaarsbergen
 11 (AASLT) Maintenance Company (11 Herstelcompagnie), in Schaarsbergen

13 Light Brigade 
The 13 Light Brigade (Dutch: 13 Lichte Brigade) is a motorized brigade that operates the Boxer armoured fighting vehicle and the Bushmaster infantry mobility vehicle.  The brigade is based in Oirschot and consists of the following units:

  13 Light Brigade, in Oirschot
 13 Staff Company (13 Stafcompagnie), in Oirschot
 17 Armoured Infantry Battalion "Fuseliers Prinses Irene" (17 Pantserinfanteriebataljon Fuseliers Prinses Irene), in Oirschot
 A; B; C and D Company, with Boxer armoured fighting vehicles
 42 Armoured Infantry Battalion "Limburgse Jagers" (42 Pantserinfanteriebataljon Limburgse Jagers), in Oirschot
 A; B; C and D Company, with Boxer armoured fighting vehicles
 30 National Reserve Corps (NATRES) Battalion (30 Natresbataljon), in Vlissingen
 Alpha Company (Alfacompagnie), in Vlissingen
 Bravo Company (Bravocompagnie), in Breda
 Charlie Company (Charliecompagnie), in Oirschot
 Delta Company (Deltacompagnie), in Brunssum
 Echo Company (Echocompagnie), in Vredepeel
 41 Armoured Engineer Battalion (41 Pantsergeniebataljon), in Oirschot
 Staff Company, 411 and 412 Armored Engineer Company, 414 CBRN Defense Company
 42 Brigade Reconnaissance Squadron "Huzaren van Boreel" (42 Brigadeverkenningseskadron Huzaren van Boreel), in Oirschot, with Fennek light armoured reconnaissance vehicles
 13 Medical Company (13 Geneeskundige Compagnie), in Oirschot
 13 Maintenance Company (13 Herstelcompagnie), in Oirschot
 Robotics and Autonomous Systems Cell (Robotica en Autonome Systemen cel), in Oirschot

43 Mechanised Brigade 
The 43 Mechanised Brigade (Dutch: 43 Gemechaniseerde Brigade) is a mechanised brigade integrated into the 1st Panzer Division of the German Army. Armoured vehicles, such as the CV90 infantry fighting vehicle and the Leopard 2 main battle tank, are at the core of the brigade. The brigade is based, with the exception of the 414 Panzer Battalion and 11 Armoured Engineer Battalion, in Havelte and consists of the following units:

  43 Mechanised Brigade, in Havelte
 43 Staff Company (43 Stafcompagnie), in Havelte
 44 Armoured Infantry Battalion "Prins Johan Willem Friso" (44 Pantserinfanteriebataljon Johan Willem Friso), in Havelte
 A; B; C and D Company, with CV9035 infantry fighting vehicles
 45 Armoured Infantry Battalion "Oranje Gelderland" (45 Pantserinfanteriebataljon Oranje Gelderland), in Havelte
 A; B; C and D Company, with CV9035 infantry fighting vehicles
 414th Panzer Battalion (GE & NL, 414 Tankbataljon), in Bergen (Germany)
 1st Staff Company
 2nd (German); 3rd (German); 4th (Dutch) and 5th (Reserve) (German) Tank Company, with Leopard 2A7 main battle tanks
 10 National Reserve Corps (NATRES) Battalion (10 Natresbataljon), in Assen
 Alpha Company (Alfacompagnie), in Assen
 Bravo Company (Bravocompagnie), in Assen
 Charlie Company (Charliecompagnie), in Wezep
 Delta Company (Deltacompagnie), in Amersfoort
 Echo Company (Echocompagnie), in Amersfoort
 Foxtrot Company (Foxtrotcompagnie), in Enschede
 11 Armoured Engineer Battalion (11 Pantsergeniebataljon), in Wezep
 Staff Company, 111 and 112 Armored Engineer Company, 101 CBRN Defense Company
 43 Brigade Reconnaissance Squadron "Huzaren van Boreel" (43 Brigadeverkenningseskadron Huzaren van Boreel), in Havelte, with Fennek light armoured reconnaissance vehicles
 43 Medical Company (43 Geneeskundige Compagnie), in Havelte
 43 Maintenance Company (43 Herstelcompagnie), in Havelte

Korps Commandotroepen
The Korps Commandotroepen is the special operations force of the Royal Netherlands Army and based in Roosendaal. It consists of the following units:

  Korps Commandotroepen, in Roosendaal
 SOF Support Company (SOF Supportcompagnie)
 Special Operations Instruction and Training Company  (Opleidings- en trainingscompagnie speciale operaties)
 103rd; 104th; 105th and 108th Commando Troops Company (Commandotroepencompagnie)

1 (German/Netherlands) Corps 
The 1 (German/Netherlands) Corps is based in Münster and has additional locations in Eibergen and Garderen. The Corps is a NATO-assigned headquarters for land operations that is led in turns by Germany and the Netherlands. It is capable of commanding a multinational force of approximately 50,000 troops. It consists of the following bi-national units:

  1 (German/Netherlands) Corps, in Münster (Germany)
 Headquarters, in Münster
 Staff Support Battalion, in Münster
 Communication & Information Systems Battalion, in Eibergen and Garderen

Joint Ground-based Air Defence Command 
The Joint Ground-based Air Defence Command (Dutch: Defensie Grondgebonden Luchtverdedigingscommando) is a joint command, consisting of both army and Royal Netherlands Air Force personnel, that is responsible for the protection of both Dutch and allied territory, vital objects and military units from airplanes, helicopters, cruise missiles, ballistic missiles and drones. In 2018 the Flugabwehrraketengruppe 61 of the German Air Force was integrated into the command. The command is based, with the exception of the Flugabwehrraketengruppe 61, at the Lieutenant General Best Barracks in Vredepeel and consists of the following units:

  Joint Ground-based Air Defence Command, in Vredepeel
 800 Support Squadron (800 Ondersteuningssquadron)
 Communication and Information Systems Flight (CIS-vlucht)
 Logistics Flight (Logistieke vlucht)
 Force Protection Flight (Force Protection-vlucht)
 802 Patriot Squadron (802 Patriot-squadron)
 Command and Control Flight(Commandovoeringsvlucht)
 3x Patriot flights (Patriot-vlucht), with Patriot long range surface-to-air missiles
 Logistics Flight (Logistieke vlucht)
 13th Air Defense Battery "Ypenburg" (13 Luchtverdedigingsbatterij Ypenburg)
 2x NASAMS Platoon (NASAMS-peloton), with NASAMS 2 medium range surface-to-air missiles and AN/MPQ-64 radar systems
 3x Stinger Platoon (Stinger-peloton), with Fennek-mounted FIM-92 Stinger short range surface-to-air missiles and TRML-3D/32 radar systems
 1x Stinger MANPAD platoon, with shoulder launched FIM-92 Stinger missile
 Counter Rocket, Artillery, and Mortar Platoon (Counter Rockets, Artillery and Mortar-peloton)
 Logistics Platoon (Logistiek peloton)
 Air Defense Missile Group 61 (Flugabwehrraketengruppe 61), in Todendorf (Germany)
 Headquarters und Staff Squadron, with LÜR radar systems
 Mantis Squadron, with MANTIS very short-range protection systems
 LeFlaSys squadron, with Wiesel 2 LeFlaSys short range surface-to-air missiles
 Training Squadron
 Instruction and Training Center (Opleidings- en Trainingscentrum)
 Ground-based Air- and Missile Defense Expertise Center (Kenniscentrum Grondgebonden Lucht- en Raketverdediging)

Operational Support Command Land 
The Operational Support Command Land (Dutch: Operationeel Ondersteuningscommando Land) provides a broad range of specialist support to the army, and is based in Apeldoorn. The command is the largest unit of the army. It consists of the following units:

  Operational Support Command Land, in Apeldoorn
 Command & Control Support Command (Command & Control Ondersteuningscommando), in Stroe
 A; B and C Signal Company
 D CEMA Company
 Signals Service School
 Joint ISTAR Command (Joint ISTAR Commando - JISTARC), in 't Harde
 Staff Squadron (Stafeskadron)
 102 Electronic Warfare Company (102 Elektronische Oorlogsvoering compagnie)
 104 JISTARC Reconnaissance Squadron (104 JISTARC Verkenningseskadron), with Fennek light armoured reconnaissance vehicles
 105 Field HUMINT Squadron (105 Field Humint-eskadron)
 106 Intelligence Squadron (106 Inlichtingeneskadron)
 107 Aerial Systems Battery (107 Aerial Systems Batterij), with RQ-11B DDL Raven, Q-27 ScanEagle, RQ-21A Integrator unmanned aerial vehicles
 108 Technical Exploitation Intelligence Company (108 Technical Exploitation Intelligence-compagnie)
 109 Open-source Intelligence Company (109 Open Sources Intelligence-compagnie)
 Fire Support Command (Vuursteun Commando), in 't Harde
 41 Artillery Battalion (41 Afdeling Artillerie)
 Headquarters Battery (Stafbatterij)
 A and B Battery, each with 9x Panzerhaubitze 2000 self-propelled howitzers
 C Battery, with 16x MO-120-RT towed mortars
 D Battery, with 6x Panzerhaubitze 2000 self-propelled howitzers
 Fire Support School (Vuursteunschool)
 Artillery Fire Range (Artillerieschietkamp)
 1 Civil-military Cooperation Command (1 Civiel en Militair Interactiecommando), in Apeldoorn
 Supply and Transport Command (Bevoorrading en Transport Commando), in Stroe
 Staff Company (Stafcompagnie)
 110 and 220 Transport Company (Transportcompagnie)
 130 and 230 Base Company (Clustercompagnie)
 140 Heavy Transport Company (140 Zwaar Transportcompagnie)
 210 Regional Transport Company (210 Regionale Vervoerscompagnie)
 240 Service Company (240 Dienstencompagnie)
 101 Engineer Battalion (101 Geniebataljon), in Wezep
 101 Staff Company (101 Stafcompagnie)
 102 and 103 Construction Company (Constructiecompagnieën)
 105 Hydraulic Engineer Company (105 Geniecompagnie Waterbouw)
 400 Medical Battalion (400 Geneeskundig Bataljon), in Ermelo
 Staff and Support Company (Staf & Ondersteuningscompagnie)
 420; 421; 422 and 423 Hospital Company (Hospitaalcompagnie)
 Defense Explosive Ordnance Disposal Service (Explosieven Opruimingsdienst Defensie), in Soesterberg
 Land Forces Command Staff Support Group (Ondersteuningsgroep CLAS), in Arnhem
 Royal Military Band "Johan Willem Friso" (Koninklijke Militaire Kapel "Johan Willem Friso)
 Regimental Fanfare Garde Grenadiers en Jagers (Regimentsfanfare Garde Grenadiers en Jagers)
 Mounted Units Regimental Fanfare (Regimentsfanfare Bereden Wapens)
 National Reserve Korps Fanfare (Fanfare Korps Nationale Reserve)
 Honorary Cavalry Escort (Cavalerie Ere Escorte)
 Defense Geography Service (Dienst Geografie Defensie)
 Military Penitentiary Center (Militair Penitentiair Centrum)
 Individual Transmission Office - Security Sector Reform (Bureau Individuele Uitzendingen - Security Sector Reform)
 Internal [Security] Service (Interne Dienstverlening)
 Military Court (Militaire Rechtbank)

Land Materiel Logistic Command  
The Land Materiel Logistic Command (Dutch: Materieellogistiek Commando Land) is responsible for the maintenance and conservation of land systems and provides advice for the procurement of new materiel. It consists of the following units:

  Land Materiel Logistic Command, in Utrecht
 300 Equipment Logistics Company (300 Materieellogistieke Compagnie), in Amersfoort
 Technical Department (Afdeling Techniek), in Leusden
 Logistics Department (Afdeling Logistiek), in Lettele
 Systems and Analysis Department (Afdeling Systemen & Analyse), in Utrecht

Instruction and Training Command  

The Instruction and Training Command (Dutch: Opleidings- en Trainingscommando) is based in Amersfoort and provides training and courses to the land forces. It consists of the following units:

  Instruction and Training Command, in Amersfoort
 Royal Military School (Koninklijke Militaire School), in Ermelo
 School North (School Noord), in Assen
 School South (School Zuid), in Oirschot
 Airmobile School (School Luchtmobiel), in Arnhem
 Land Training and Land Warfare Center (Land Training Centre en Land Warfare Centre), in Amersfoort
 Maneuver Instruction and Training Center (Opleidings- en Trainingscentrum Manoeuvre), in Amersfoort
 Maneuver School (Manoeuvreschool)
 Shooting Training School (Schiet Training School)
 Signal School (School Verbindingsdienst)
 Ground Air Cooperation School (School Grond Lucht Samenwerking)
 Peace Missions School (School voor Vredesmissies)
 Ground-based Maneuver Expertise Center (Kenniscentrum Grondgebonden Manoeuvre)
 Military & Equipment Defense Expertise Center (Defensie Expertise Centrum Militair & Uitrusting)
 Logistics Company (Logistieke compagnie)
 Engineer Instruction and Training Center (Opleidings- en Trainingscentrum Genie), in Vught
 Miners and Sappers School (Mineurs- en Sappeursschool), in Vught and Reek
 Pioneer and Pontonnier School (Pioniers- en Pontonniersschool), in Vught, Hedel and Wezep
 CBRN Defense Center (Defensie CBRN Centrum), in Vught
 Engineer Expertise Center (Kenniscentrum Genie), in Vught
 Logistics Instruction and Training Center (Opleidings- en Trainingscentrum Logistiek), in Soesterberg
 Driving Instruction and Training Center (Opleidings- en Trainingscentrum Rijden), in Oirschot
 Physical Training and Sport Organisation (Lichamelijke Oefening & Sportorganisatie), at various locations

National Reserve Corps

The National Reserve Corps (Dutch: Korps Nationale Reserve) provides support during large incidents. The reserve battalions are all integrated into one of the three combat brigades. It consists of the following units:

 10th NATRES Battalion of the 43rd Mechanized Brigade. Area of operations is the north and the east of the Netherlands.
 20th NATRES Battalion of the 11th Air Assault Brigade. Area of operations are the west and the centre of the Netherlands.
 30th NATRES Battalion of the 13th Light Brigade. Area of operations is the south of the Netherlands.

References 

Netherlands Army